SciRef is an academic reference manager for Windows.  SciRef can retrieve references from sources like ScienceDirect, PubMed and any site supporting the export to RIS (file format). SciRef also is used to collect and manage related material, such as PDF files.  SciRef can format bibliographies in many common formats. SciRef directly works with Microsoft Word.

See also
 Comparison of reference management software for some comparisons with similar packages.

References

External links
 SciRef Home

Windows-only software
Reference management software